University Džemal Bijedić of Mostar (Bosnian: Univerzitet "Džemal Bijedić" u Mostaru / Универзитет "Џемал Биједић" у Мостару) is a public university located in Mostar, Bosnia and Herzegovina. It was established in 1977 and is named after Mostar-born Bosnian and Yugoslav politician Džemal Bijedić. It consists of eight faculties.

Students

See also
 List of universities in Bosnia and Herzegovina
 Education in Bosnia and Herzegovina
 University of Mostar
 List of split up universities

References

External links
 Official website

 
Universities and colleges in Mostar
Educational institutions established in 1977
1977 establishments in Yugoslavia